Globehunters: An Around the World in 80 Days Adventure is a 2002 animated television film which originally aired on Nickelodeon on December 15, 2002 and eventually aired on VHS and DVD by MGM Home Entertainment as a DIC Movie Toon. Loosely based on Around the World in Eighty Days by Jules Verne, the plot follows a trio of genetic animals, a gorilla named Eddie, a cheetah named Sasha, and a parrot named Trevor, who decide to escape a laboratory and travel the world in hopes of finding a place known as Himalaya USA. Meanwhile, a hunter is tasked with catching the animals within a period of eighty days – before the tracking devices attached to the latter self-destruct.

The film was initially distributed by DIC Entertainment and is nowadays a property of WildBrain, which holds the rights to the DIC Movie Toons, as well as most of DIC's library, and ViacomCBS.

Cast 
 Lee Cherry as Eddie, a western lowland gorilla.
 Kenna Ramsey as Sasha, a cheetah.
 Brian Beacock as Trevor, a parrot.
 Sid Caesar as Jacob, an african elephant.
 Willem Dafoe as Jack Hunter
 Chaka Khan as Marla
 Carl Reiner as Maz, an owl.
 Wally Wingert as Raj Kangaroo
 Dwight Schultz as Dr. Burke
 Quinton Flynn as Dr. Wilkins and Spume
 Pat Musick as a Leopard and the French Newswomen
 Greg Eagles as the Old Lion and a Tiger
 Frank Welker as a Security Guard and the Circus Baboon

Production 
The story and script were written by Tim Wade and Danny Hartigan. The music for the film's songs were written by Emmy Award-winning lyricist John Kavanaugh, lyrics by John Kavanaugh and Barbara Epstein, the film's executive producer. The animation was produced overseas by Rough Draft Korea.

Release 
The film was initially scheduled for a 2000 air date on Nickelodeon, alongside The Electric Piper: A Pied Piper Adventure. Globehunters was released on DVD and VHS on 2003 by MGM Home Entertainment, and re-released on DVD on September 2, 2008, by Gaiam.

References

External links 
 

2002 television films
2002 films
Nickelodeon original films
American children's animated adventure films
Films based on Around the World in Eighty Days
DIC Entertainment films
Frederator Studios
Rough Draft Studios films
2002 animated films
2000s American films
2000s French films